The Socialist Youth League of Yugoslavia (abbreviated SSOJ) was a youth organization in Yugoslavia, the youth wing of the Socialist Party of Yugoslavia. It was founded by the students circle in Zagreb in 1921. As of the late 1920s, the claimed to have around 1,500 members.

References

Youth wings of political parties in Yugoslavia
Youth wings of social democratic parties
1921 establishments in Yugoslavia

Youth organizations established in 1921